Malta competed at the 2020 Summer Olympics in Tokyo. Originally scheduled to take place from 24 July to 9 August 2020, the Games were postponed to 23 July to 8 August 2021, because of the COVID-19 pandemic.

Competitors
The following is the list of number of competitors in the Games.

Athletics

Malta received a universality slot from the World Athletics to send a female track and field athlete to the Olympics.

Track & road events

Badminton

For the first time in history, Malta entered one badminton player into the Olympic tournament. Matthew Abela accepted the invitation from the Tripartite Commission and the Badminton World Federation to compete in the men's singles.

Shooting

Malta received an invitation from the Tripartite Commission to send a women's pistol shooter to the Olympics, based on her minimum qualifying score (MQS) attained on or before June 6, 2021.

Swimming

Malta received a universality invitation from FINA to send two top-ranked swimmers (one per gender) in their respective individual events to the Olympics, based on the FINA Points System of June 28, 2021.

Weightlifting

Malta receiving one tripartite invitation quotas from International Weightlifting Federation.

References

Nations at the 2020 Summer Olympics
2020
2021 in Maltese sport